Home Work Convention, created in 1996, is an International Labour Organization (ILO) Convention, which came into force in 2000. It offers protection to workers who are employed in their own homes.

Overview
It was established in 1996, with the preamble stating:
Noting that the particular conditions characterizing home work make it desirable to improve the application of those Conventions and Recommendations to homeworkers, and to supplement them by standards which take into account the special characteristics of home work

The Convention provides protection for home workers, giving them equal rights with regard to workplace health and safety, social security rights, access to training, remuneration, minimum age of employment, maternity protection, and other rights.

Objectives of the Home Work Convention 
The term home work means remote work done by a person in a place other than the workplace of the employer. The term employer describes a person, who, either directly or through an intermediary, provides home work in pursuance of his or her business.

Each member of the Convention aims the continuous improving the situation of homeworkers. The intention of the Convention is to strengthen the principle of equal treatment, in particular to guarantee the establishment of the rights of homeworkers.

In addition, the Convention has the specific purpose of protecting against discrimination in the following areas of employment: occupational safety, remuneration, social security protection, access to training, minimum age for taking up employment and maternity benefits.

Safety and health at work 
National laws and regulations on safety and health at work also apply to home work. When working at home, certain conditions must be adapted so that a safe and healthy working environment is ensured.

Ratifications
The Convention has been ratified by 13 countries as of 2022:

References 

 - ILO Convention C177

External links 
Text.
Ratifications.

International Labour Organization conventions
Telecommuting
Treaties concluded in 1996
Treaties entered into force in 2000
Treaties of Albania
Treaties of Argentina
Treaties of Belgium
Treaties of Bosnia and Herzegovina
Treaties of Bulgaria
Treaties of Finland
Treaties of Ireland
Treaties of the Netherlands
Treaties of Tajikistan
Treaties of North Macedonia
1996 in labor relations